Vries is a surname. People with the surname include:

 Gino Vries (born 1987), South African cricketer
 Maarten Gerritsz Vries (1589–late 1647), Dutch cartographer and explorer
 Sherwin Vries (born 1980), South African sprinter
 Virgil Vries (born 1989), Namibian football player

See also
 De Vries

Dutch-language surnames